Carlisle Cathedral is a grade-I listed Anglican cathedral in the city of Carlisle, Cumbria, England. It was founded as an Augustinian priory and became a cathedral in 1133. It is also the seat of the Bishop of Carlisle.

Carlisle is the second smallest of England's ancient cathedrals. Its notable features include figurative stone carving, a set of medieval choir stalls and the largest window in the Flowing Decorated Gothic style in England.

History

Carlisle Cathedral was begun in 1122, during the reign of King Henry I, as a community of Canons Regular following the reform of the Abbey of Arrouaise in France, which followed a strict form of the canonical life, influenced by the ascetic practices of the Cistercians. Many large churches of Augustinian foundation were built in England during this period as the Archbishop of Canterbury, William de Corbeil, was a member of this order, but Carlisle is one of only four Augustinian churches in England to become a cathedral, most monastic cathedrals being Benedictine. The church was begun by Athelwold, an Englishman, who became the first prior. In 1133, the church was raised to the status of cathedral and Athelwold became the first Bishop of Carlisle (1133–55). In 1233, the cathedral priory community were joined by two friaries in the city. A Dominican friary and a Franciscan friary were founded close to the cathedral. The building was refurbished in the 13th and 14th centuries, receiving impetus from the presence of the court of Edward I in 1307.

In the 15th and early 16th centuries, the monastic buildings were renewed. With the Dissolution of the Monasteries from 1536, and the establishment by Henry VIII of the Church of England as the country's official church, the Dominican and Franciscan friaries were dissolved and Carlisle cathedral was run by a secular chapter like the cathedrals at Lincoln and York, which practice has continued to this day. During the time of the English Civil War, a portion of the nave of the cathedral was demolished by the Scottish Presbyterian Army in order to use the stone to reinforce Carlisle Castle. Between 1853 and 1870 Carlisle Cathedral was restored by Ewan Christian. In the early 19th century, the cathedral became the subject for a geometric analysis by Robert William Billings.

Architecture

Carlisle Cathedral was commenced in 1123 as a monastic church, possibly on the foundations of an earlier church, in the Norman architectural style with solid masonry, large round piers, round arches and smallish round headed windows. These features may still be seen in the south transept and the remaining two bays of the nave, which are now used as the Chapel of the Border Regiment. The stone is the local red sandstone, which has discoloured almost to black on parts of the exterior. The building has also suffered from subsidence which is evidenced by the piers, which lean at different angles.

In the 13th century, the choir of the cathedral was rebuilt in the Gothic style, wider than the original and on a different axis. However, the new work was severely damaged in a fire in 1292, and the work was recommenced. By 1322 the arcades and the easternmost bay were complete, with the elaborate tracery and glass of the east window being in place by about 1350. The upper stages of the walls were finished, probably by the architect John Lewen who died in about 1398. The Gothic arcade has richly moulded arches with dog-tooth decoration, and the twelve capitals are carved with vegetation along with small lively figures representing the labours of the months.

The choir is roofed by a fine wooden barrel vault dating from the 14th century. In 1856 this was restored and repainted to a new design by Owen Jones. It is thought the eastern bays of the cathedral never received a stone vault because at some point the central spire blew down, and funds were required to rebuild the damaged tower and north transept, completed in about 1420.

The most significant architectural feature of Carlisle Cathedral is its East Window. The tracery of this window is in the most complex of English Gothic styles, Flowing Decorated Gothic. It is the largest and most complex such window in England, being 51 feet high and 26 feet wide. It has nine lights, and tracery, which, it has been calculated, was drafted from 263 points. The tracery of the window still contains much of its original medieval glass.

Carlisle Cathedral has a fine set of 46 carved wooden choir stalls with misericords, which were installed in the early 15th century.  Misericords are hinged seats, "constructed to keep the monks from falling asleep while at prayers," and carved with numerous figures and creatures. Despite their purpose, the "pillars supporting the canopies bear traces of having been burnt, by weary monks who dropped off to sleep in the midst of their interminable devotions while holding a lighted candle in their hands." The misericords were made out of black oak, and their backs carved with scenes of the legends of St. Anthony the Hermit, St. Cuthbert, St. Augustine, and the twelve apostles, as well as mythical themes. The misericords of Carlisle include typical iconography of "half-length angels, beasts deriving from the Bestiary, hybrid creatures, and narrative scenes, including the inverted world theme of the Woman beating a Man that no decent set of misericords could be without."

The delicate gilt canopy over the high altar is a modern work designed by Sir Charles Nicholson.

Other buildings of interest in the precinct are the Fratry dating from about 1500 and the Gatehouse of 1527.

In mediaeval times the Fratry building was the dining hall of the Cathedral Priory. The £3.4 million Fratry Project commenced in 2019 to add a new extension designed by architects Feilden Fowles. The deanery incorporates a 15th-century pele tower, called The Prior's Tower, containing a fine contemporary painted ceiling.

Dean and chapter
As of 3 October 2022:
Dean — vacant since Mark Boyling's retirement, 30 September 2022
Canon Missioner — Michael Manley (since 2007)
Canon Warden — Benjamin Cartner (since 2021 installation)
Diocesan Canon — vacant since 7 October 2019 (most recently Diocesan Director of Ordinands)

Music

Organ
The earliest documented organ at Carlisle Cathedral is one mentioned in an inventory of 1571. The present organ was built by Henry Willis in 1856 and was innovative for its date. It was enlarged in 1875 to include the 32-foot pipes. In 1906 it was further extended by Harrison & Harrison. In 1930, the organ was moved to its present position by an unknown builder. In 1962, J. W. Walker & Sons Ltd rebuilt the organ to give it a more classical sound. In 1997, a rebuilding by David Wells sought to restore the organ to its original Victorian tone. At this time a number of new stops were added.
The organ has 4 manuals, 72 stops: Pedal 18 stops, Positive 14 stops, Great 13 stops, Swell 14 stops, Solo 13 stops.

Organists

The earliest recorded appointment of an organist at Carlisle Cathedral is of Thomas Southick in 1650. Notable organists have included the composer, astronomer and mathematician Thomas Greatorex and founder of the Royal School of Church Music, Sir Sydney Nicholson. The present organist is Mark Duthie.

Choirs

Carlisle Cathedral Choir
The Carlisle Cathedral Choir dates from the foundation of the cathedral in 1133, when four laymen and six boy choristers assisted the canons with music.

In 1545, the Cathedral Statutes provided for four lay clerks and six choristers, who were to be "boys of tender age with sonorous voices and apt at chanting".

The present Cathedral Choir consists of 16 choristers and 6 lay clerks. The choristers were originally educated at the cathedral's Choir School but this was closed in 1935, and the boys are instead drawn from local schools. There is now also a choir of 16 girl choristers, who alternate with the boys in singing three services a week, with Evensong sung daily except Saturday, and Choral Eucharist at 10.30am on Sundays. The boys and girls are aged from 8–13 years and are recruited from local schools. They are selected at voice trials held during the year and receive a thorough musical training. They are awarded an annual bursary and pocket money.

Carlisle Cathedral Consort

The cathedral also has a choir for boys and girls aged 13–18 years who sing services in the cathedral once a week during term time. They are conducted by Edward Taylor, the Assistant Organist. The choir last went on tour, to Brittany, in October 2010.

Carlisle Cathedral Carliol Choir
The Voluntary Choir, consisting of mixed voices, was formed to sing occasional services in the absence of the Cathedral and Youth Choirs.

Carlisle Cathedral Music Appeal
In 1999 the Carlisle Cathedral Music Appeal was launched with a target of £750,000 to establish a choral foundation to enable annual bursaries and free instrumental lessons to be provided for the choristers, and scholarships and vocal tuition for the choral scholars.

Burials

Richard Bell (bishop), Bishop of Carlisle (1478–1495)
Robert de Chauncy, Bishop of Carlisle (1257–1278)
Ralph of Irton, Bishop of Carlisle (1278–1292)
John de Halton, Bishop of Carlisle (1292–1324)
John May, Bishop of Carlisle (1577–1598)
William Dacre, 3rd Baron Dacre
Richard Senhouse, Bishop of Carlisle (1624–1626) – preached the coronation sermon for Charles I in 1626
Edmund Law, Bishop of Carlisle (1768–1787)
Samuel Waldegrave, Bishop of Carlisle (1860–1869)

A memorial by Sir Robert Lorimer to the Border Regiment dates from 1916.

See also

 Architecture of the medieval cathedrals of England
 Grade I listed buildings in Cumbria
 Grade I listed churches in Cumbria
 Listed buildings in Carlisle, Cumbria

References

External links

 Official site
 Bell's Cathedrals: The Cathedral Church of Carlisle – from Project Gutenberg.
 Interpretation panels installed at Carlisle Cathedral
 Illustrations of geometric tracery from the paneling belonging to Carlisle Cathedral by Robert William Billings – from Open Library

Buildings and structures in Carlisle, Cumbria
Churches in Cumbria
Tourist attractions in Cumbria
Anglican cathedrals in England
Grade I listed churches in Cumbria
Grade I listed cathedrals
English churches with Norman architecture
English Gothic architecture in Cumbria
Monasteries in Cumbria
Arrouaisians
Augustinian monasteries in England
Pre-Reformation Roman Catholic cathedrals
Diocese of Carlisle
1536 disestablishments in England
Grade I listed monasteries
Ewan Christian buildings